Elizabeth Selina Eger (born 1971) is a reader in the Department of English at King's College London. She is a specialist in women's writing of the eighteenth century, the concept of luxury, and the lives of "Bluestocking" women. She initiated and co-curated the exhibition Brilliant Women: 18th-Century Bluestockings which was held at the National Portrait Gallery, London, in 2008.

Early life
Elizabeth Eger was born in the Hammersmith district of London in 1971 to John Cedric Eger, a Swiss national who became a naturalised British citizen in 1976, and Selina Mary Dix Hamilton. She has a sister Helen born in 1973. Eger was educated at James Allen's Girls' School and King's College, University of Cambridge.

Career
Eger completed her PhD at King's College Cambridge, and had research fellowships at the University of Warwick, working on "The Luxury Project", and at the University of Liverpool. She is currently a reader in English at King's College London. Her research interests include women's writing of the eighteenth century, the concept of luxury and the lives of "Bluestocking" women.
 She initiated and co-curated the exhibition Brilliant Women: 18th-Century Bluestockings which was held at the National Portrait Gallery, London, in 2008 and with Lucy Peltz wrote the accompanying book. In 2014, she appeared on BBC Radio 4's In Our Time to discuss the Bluestockings.

Personal life
Eger is married with two children.

Selected publications
Women, writing and the public sphere, 1700-1830. Cambridge University Press, Cambridge, 2001. (Joint editor) 
Luxury in the eighteenth-century: Debates, desires and delectable goods. Palgrave Macmillan, 2003. (Edited with Maxine Berg) 
Brilliant women: 18th-Century bluestockings. Yale University Press, New Haven, 2008. (With Lucy Peltz) 
Bluestockings: Women of reason from Enlightenment to Romanticism. Palgrave Macmillan, 2010. 
Bluestockings displayed: Portraiture, performance and patronage, 1730-1830. Cambridge University Press, Cambridge, 2013. (Editor)

References 

Living people
Historians of English literature
Academics of King's College London
1971 births
People from the London Borough of Hammersmith and Fulham
People educated at James Allen's Girls' School
Alumni of King's College, Cambridge